Big Muddy Creek is a tributary of the Missouri River, approximately 191 mi (307 km) long, in the Canadian province of Saskatchewan and the U.S. state of Montana. Its source is in the Big Muddy Badlands of Saskatchewan.

Big Muddy Creek begins in southern Saskatchewan at Big Muddy Lake, east of Big Beaver, Saskatchewan. It flows south through the Big Muddy Badlands and into Sheridan County, Montana, past Redstone. From there, east past Plentywood and then south forming the eastern border of Fort Peck Indian Reservation. It joins the Missouri west of Culbertson.

It was explored in 1805 by the Lewis and Clark Expedition, who called it Martha's River in their journals and noticed on their return voyage in 1806 that it had changed its mouth on the Missouri.

Along with the Milk River and the Poplar River, it is one of three waterways in Canada that drain into the Gulf of Mexico.

Variant names 
Big Muddy Creek has also been known as: Big Muddy River, Little Yellow River, Martha River, Martha's River, Marthas River, Marthy's River and Park River.

See also 

List of rivers of Montana
List of rivers of Saskatchewan
List of tributaries of the Missouri River

References 

Rivers of Montana
Rivers of Saskatchewan
Tributaries of the Missouri River
Bodies of water of Roosevelt County, Montana
Bodies of water of Sheridan County, Montana
Happy Valley No. 10, Saskatchewan
International rivers of North America